Philippe Fofana Dougou (born 18 July 1996) is an Ivorian professional footballer who plays as a forward.

References

Living people
1996 births
Ivorian footballers
Association football forwards
FC Saxan players
GOAL FC players
Moldovan Super Liga players
Ivorian expatriate footballers
Expatriate footballers in Moldova
Ivorian expatriate sportspeople in Moldova
Expatriate footballers in France
Ivorian expatriate sportspeople in France